Musabeyli, formerly Murat Höyük, is a town and the seat of the Musabeyli District in the Kilis Province of Turkey. It had a total population of 5,594 in 2022. It had a population of 1,155 in 2022.

Demographics 
The town is populated by both Kurds and Turks.

References

External links 
 the district governorate 

Populated places in Kilis Province
Musabeyli District